The year 2005 is the 4th year in the history of the Universal Reality Combat Championship, a mixed martial arts promotion based in the Philippines. In 2005 the URCC held 2 events beginning with, URCC 6: Unleashed Fury.

Events list

URCC 6: Unleashed Fury

URCC 6: Unleashed Fury was an event held on June 25, 2005 at Casino Filipino in Parañaque, Metro Manila, Philippines.

Results

URCC 7: The Art of War

URCC 7: The Art of War was an event held on December 10, 2005 at the Araneta Coliseum in Quezon City, Metro Manila, Philippines.

Results

See also
 Universal Reality Combat Championship

References

Universal Reality Combat Championship events
2005 in mixed martial arts